Östadkulle is a locality situated in Vårgårda Municipality, Västra Götaland County, Sweden with 245 inhabitants in 2010.

References 

Populated places in Västra Götaland County
Populated places in Vårgårda Municipality